Emir Munzer Mosque is a mosque located in Beirut Central District, Lebanon.

Overview
The mosque was constructed by Emir Munzer Al-Tannoukhi, who was the Governor of Beirut between 1616 and 1633. Partly damaged during the Lebanese Civil War, the mosque was restored in 2002.

Construction and history
This mosque was constructed by Emir Munzer Al-Tannoukhi. The mosque was also known as Masjid Al-Naoufara because of the fountain in its courtyard. The mosque has two entrances: the original 17th century arch portal from Souk Al-Bazarkhan, and a second entrance with three arches, added when the adjacent building was demolished to make way for the new Emir Fakhreddine Street (later renamed Riad Al-Solh Street). Roman granite columns were re-used in the construction of the mosque’s courtyard.  In 1749, the brothers Emir Melhem and Emir Mansour Haydar Al-Shehab restored the building. Partly damaged during the Civil War (1975-1990), the mosque was restored in 2002.

Timeline

1616-1633:  Emir Munzer Al-Tannoukhi, governor of Beirut, built the mosque when he was in power between 1616-1633.

1749: The building was restored by brothers Emir Melhem and Emir Mansour Haydar Al-Shehab.

1975-1990: Mosque was partly damaged during the Lebanese Civil War.

2002: The mosque was restored.

See also
 Foch Street
 Lebanese Civil War

References 
 Al-Wali, Sheikh Mohammad Taha (1973) Tarikh al-masajid wal jawami’ al-sharifa fi Bayrout, Dar al-Kotob, Beirut.
 Hallaq, Hassan (1987) Al-tarikh alijtima'i wa al-siyasi wa al-iqtisadi fi Bayrut, [Social, Political and Economic History of Beirut], Dar al-Jamia’t Beirut.
 Hallaq, Hassan (1987) Bayrut al-mahrousa fil'ahd al-'uthmâni, [Beirut during the Ottoman Period], Dar Al-Jami'at, Beirut.

Buildings and structures in Beirut
Monuments and memorials in Lebanon
Mosques in Beirut
Tourist attractions in Beirut